Oliver Walker (born 1985) is a British actor.

Oliver Walker may also refer to:

Oliver Ormerod Walker (1833–1914), British politician
Oliver Walker (journalist) (1906–1965), South African journalist
Henry Oliver Walker (1843–1929), American painter